The 2024 World Athletics U20 Championships, also known colloquially by its former official title, the World Junior Championships, will be an international athletics competition for athletes qualifying as juniors (born no earlier than 1 January 2005), which be held from 20 to 25 August 2024 at the Estadio Atlético de la Videna in Lima, Peru.

Lima, which already hosted the 2019 Pan American Games, will become the first venue in Peru to host a World Athletics Series event.

References

External links
 Official Site

 
World U20 Championships
World Athletics U20 Championships
World Athletics U20 Championships
Sport in Lima
International athletics competitions hosted by Peru
World Athletics U20 Championships
2024 World Athletics U20 Championships